It's Getting Tougher to Say the Right Things is a compilation album of early material by the Californian hardcore punk band, Unbroken. All tracks were recorded between 1992 and 1995, and released on March, 2000 by Indecision Records. Love Will Tear Us Apart is a cover of the song from Joy Division. Track 11 Unheard actually finishes at 2:56, followed by five minutes of silence and 4 hidden live tracks.

Track listing

Credits
 Dave Claibourn – vocals
 Eric Allen – guitar
 Steve Miller – guitar
 Rob Moran – bass
 Todd Beattie – drums

External links
 Indecision Records album page
 [ Allmusic Guide album entry]

2000 compilation albums
Unbroken (band) albums
Indecision Records compilation albums